Giovanni Battista Crespi (23 December 1573 – 23 October 1632), called Il Cerano, was an Italian painter, sculptor, and architect.

Biography
He was born in Romagnano Sesia, the son of a painter, Raffaele Crespi, and moved to Cerano with his family some years later. In 1591 he is known to have been living in Milan.

True to the Counter-Reformation piety zealously expressed in Milanese art of his time, his paintings focus on mysteries and mystical episodes in saintly life. The crowded canvases and the angles recall Mannerism, but his paintings show an emotion that evokes common sentiments in Baroque art. Along with other artists, he completed a series of paintings (Quadroni of St. Charles) of the life of St. Charles Borromeo for the Duomo of Milan; an altarpiece with the Baptism of St. Augustine for San Marco, Milan; and a Mass of St. Gregory for the Basilica of San Vittore in Varese (1615–17). Also see the nightmarish, St. Gregory Delivers the Soul of a Monk (1617), also in San Vittore.

He was a scholar of considerable attainments and held a position of dignity in Cerano. In 1620 he was appointed the head of the Accademia Ambrosiana founded by Cardinal Federico Borromeo. Among his pupils were Daniele Crespi, Carlo Francesco Nuvolone, and Melchiorre Gherardini.

External links
Painters of reality: the legacy of Leonardo and Caravaggio in Lombardy, an exhibition catalogue from The Metropolitan Museum of Art (fully available online as PDF), which contains material on Crespi (see index)
http://www.verbanensia.org/quadro_details.asp?quID=18755
http://www.verbanensia.org/quadro_details.asp?quID=16003
http://www.verbanensia.org/quadro_details.asp?quID=15651

References

1573 births
1632 deaths
People from the Romagnano Sesia
16th-century Italian painters
Italian male painters
17th-century Italian painters
16th-century Italian sculptors
Italian male sculptors
17th-century Italian sculptors
Painters from Milan
Italian Mannerist architects
Italian Mannerist painters
Italian Mannerist sculptors

Catholic painters
Catholic sculptors